According to biblical sources, Cushan-rishathaim ( Ḵūšān Riš‘āṯayim, "twice-evil Kushite") was king of Aram-Naharaim, or Northwest Mesopotamia, and the first oppressor of the Israelites after their settlement in Canaan. In the Book of Judges, God delivers the Israelites into his hand for eight years (Judges 3:8) as a punishment for polytheism. However, when the people of Israel "called to Jehovah", He saved them through Othniel, son of Kenaz (Judges 3:9).

Scholars have proposed several explanations for Biblical accounts related to this ruler.

'Cushan' or 'Chushan' may indicate Cushite origins. 'Rishathaim' means 'double-wickedness'("resha" רשע - "evil" or "wickedness" + "im" יים - doubling suffix). The latter was likely a pejorative appellation used by his Hebrew foes, rather than what this King called himself. Use of it may indicate that the Hebrews had concrete reasons to bear him a grudge, beyond the meager information given in the surviving Biblical text.

References

Sources
 

Aramean kings
Book of Judges monarchs